The following article presents a summary of the 1979 football (soccer) season in Brazil, which was the 78th season of competitive football in the country.

Campeonato Brasileiro Série A

Semifinals

|}

Final

Internacional declared as the Campeonato Brasileiro champions by aggregate score of 4-1.

State championship champions

(1)In 1979, two editions of the Rio de Janeiro State Championship were played because Guanabara State's and Rio de Janeiro State's football federations merged in 1978. The Rio de Janeiro State Football Federation organized both competitions, which were won by Flamengo.

Youth competition champions

Other competition champions

Brazilian clubs in international competitions

Brazil national team
The following table lists all the games played by the Brazil national football team in official competitions and friendly matches during 1979.

References

 Brazilian competitions at RSSSF
 1979 Brazil national team matches at RSSSF

 
Seasons in Brazilian football
Brazil